José Manuel Correa Ceseña (born 2 September 1947) is a Mexican politician from the Institutional Revolutionary Party. He has served as Deputy of the LV and LVIII Legislatures of the Mexican Congress representing Jalisco.

References

1947 births
Living people
Politicians from Baja California Sur
Institutional Revolutionary Party politicians
21st-century Mexican politicians
People from San José del Cabo
University of Guadalajara alumni
20th-century Mexican politicians
Deputies of the LVIII Legislature of Mexico
Members of the Chamber of Deputies (Mexico) for Jalisco